Cooltide is an album by John Martyn. Recorded at CaVa Sound Workshops, Glasgow, Scotland. Originally released on CD by Permanent Records, catalogue number PERM CD 4.

The album marks the handover by longtime Martyn keyboard collaborator Foster Patterson to his successor Spencer Cozens. Cozens had to sit his college final examinations during the recording, and Patterson returned to deputise in his absence.

Track listing
All tracks composed by John Martyn except where indicated.

"Hole In The Rain"
"Annie Says"
"Jack The Lad"
"Number Nine"
"The Cure"
"Same Difference"
"Father Time"
"Call Me"
"Cooltide"

Personnel
(as listed on original CD release)
John Martyn - guitars, vocals
Spencer Cozens - keyboards, bass synth
Foster Patterson - keyboards
Alan Thomson - bass ("Same Difference", "Call Me")
Dave Ball - bass ("Number Nine")
John Henderson - drums
Aran Ahmun - drums ("Number Nine")
Miles Bould - percussion
Andy Sheppard - soprano sax
Joe Locke - vibes
Jessica King - backing vocals ("Same Difference")

Notes

External links
The Official John Martyn Website

John Martyn albums
1991 albums
Permanent Records albums